Darron Karl McDonough (born 7 November 1962) is an English former footballer, most noted as a player for Oldham Athletic and Luton Town.

Playing career

Born in Antwerp but raised in Lancashire, McDonough joined his local side Oldham Athletic from school as an apprentice in 1980. He played in 183 games in six seasons at Boundary Park before signing for Luton Town in an £87,000 transfer deal. He represented the Bedfordshire club 105 times in five seasons. Injuries plagued his time at Luton, and he was sidelined for Luton's famous League Cup victory over Arsenal in 1987–88, though he did appear in the defeat to Nottingham Forest a year later. He was Kevin Keegan's first signing for Newcastle United in 1992, but only three matches into his time on Tyneside a snapped Achilles tendon forced an end to his career.

Post-retirement

McDonough now runs his own joinery business. He lives in Oldham, Greater Manchester, in a house he built himself.

References

1962 births
Living people
English footballers
English Football League players
Oldham Athletic A.F.C. players
Luton Town F.C. players
Newcastle United F.C. players
Footballers from Greater Manchester
People from Oldham
Association football midfielders